Charleston Township may refer to:

Charleston Township, Coles County, Illinois
Charleston Township, Lee County, Iowa
Charleston Township, Michigan
Charleston Township, Pennsylvania

See also 
 Charlestown Township (disambiguation)

Township name disambiguation pages